The 47th Parliament of Australia is the current meeting of the legislative branch of the Australian federal government, composed of the Australian Senate and the Australian House of Representatives. The 2022 federal election gave the Australian Labor Party control of the House; Labor won 77 seats in the lower house and holds a two-seat majority government. Labor leader Anthony Albanese became the 31st Prime Minister of Australia, and was sworn in by the Governor-General David Hurley on 23 May 2022. The 47th Parliament opened in Canberra on 26 July 2022.

Major events and legislation

 The Climate Change Act 2022 passed the parliament on 8 September 2022, having been approved by the House by 86 votes to 50 and the Senate by 37 votes to 30. The legislation codifies a 43 per cent emissions reduction target by 2030 (on 2005 levels), requires the Climate Change Authority to provide advice on Australia’s progress against those targets, mandates that the Minister for Climate Change reports annually to Parliament on Australia's progress, and forces federal government agencies to adhere to the legislative requirements of the Act.
 The Social Security Amendment Act 2022 passed the parliament on 28 September 2022, having passed the House by 86 votes to 56 and the Senate by 33 votes to 26. The legislation repealed the mandatory Cashless Welfare Card, originally introduced as a trial in 2016 for 12,500 people across four trial sites, which quarantined around 80% of a person's income so it could not be spent on alcohol or gambling or withdrawn in cash. As a result of the legislative change, participants could opt out of the scheme, though around 4,300 people in the Northern Territory and Cape York remained on the card prior to the introduction of a compulsory income-management scheme in 2023.
 The Anti-Discrimination and Human Rights Legislation Amendment (Respect at Work) Act 2022 passed the parliament on 28 November 2022. The legislation implemented seven of the recommendations of the Kate Jenkins-authored Respect@Work report into sexual harassment. Among other reforms, the laws impose a positive onus on employers to take steps to demonstrate that they're proactively attempting to eliminate sex discrimination "as far as possible". In addition, victimising conduct can be the basis of a civil, not just criminal, complaint, and public sector agencies are newly required to report to the Workplace Gender Equality Agency as occurs with private sector agencies.
 The National Anti-Corruption Commission Act 2022 passed the parliament on 30 November 2022. The legislation established the National Anti-Corruption Commission, an independent federal agency equipped with the power to investigate Commonwealth ministers, public servants, statutory office holders, government agencies, parliamentarians and parliamentary staff for corrupt or improper behaviour.
 The Fair Work Legislation Amendment Act 2022 passed the parliament on 2 December 2022. The legislation passed the House of Representatives by 80 votes to 56 and passed the Senate by 35 votes to 31. The workplace relations reforms introduce multi-employer bargaining, allow the Fair Work Commission to authorise workers with sufficient common interests to bargain together and abolish the Australian Building and Construction Commission and Registered Organisations Commission. The legislation passed with the support of the Greens and Senator David Pocock, who each won government support for an enforceable right to request unpaid parental leave and measures to prevent a loophole in the better-off-overall test in the legislation, as well as the creation of a statutory advisory committee of experts to provide independent advice concerning "economic inclusion" of lower-income people, welfare recipients and cost-of-living relief.
 The Restoring Territory Rights Act 2022 passed the parliament on 1 December 2022. The legislation, which abolished the federal ban on the Northern Territory and Australian Capital Territory legislatures passing laws to permit euthanasia schemes (originally passed in 1997) was subject to a conscience vote for most parties. It was approved by 99 votes to 37 in the House of Representatives and by 41 votes to 25 in the Senate.

Leadership

Senate

Presiding officer 
 President of the Senate: Sue Lines

Government leadership
 Leader of the Government: Penny Wong
 Deputy Leader of the Government: Don Farrell 
 Chief Government Whip: Anne Urquhart
 Deputy Government Whips: Raff Ciccone & Louise Pratt
 Manager of Government Business: Katy Gallagher

Opposition leadership
 Leader of the Opposition: Simon Birmingham
 Deputy Leader of the Opposition: Michaelia Cash
 Chief Opposition Whip: Wendy Askew
 Deputy Opposition Whips: Paul Scarr & Matt O'Sullivan
 Manager of Opposition Business: Anne Ruston

House of Representatives

Presiding officer 
 Speaker of the House: Milton Dick

Government leadership
 Leader of the House: Tony Burke
 Chief Government Whip: Joanne Ryan
 Government Whips: Anne Stanley & David Smith

Opposition leadership
 Manager of Opposition Business: Paul Fletcher 
 Chief Opposition Whip: Bert van Manen
 Opposition Whips: Melissa Price & Rowan Ramsey

Party summary

House of Representatives

Senate

Demographics 
The 47th Parliament of Australia has a historically high representation of women; women make up 38% of the House of Representatives and 57% of the Senate, the highest on record for both chambers. In terms of representation, Indigenous members will account for 9.6 per cent of the 76 Senate seats, and 1.2 per cent of 151 House of Representatives seats.

Senate 
The Senate included 33 men and 43 women, the most women to date.

House of Representatives 
There are 58 women in the House, the largest number in history. Three current members are LGBTQ+ — Stephen Bates, Angie Bell and Julian Hill. Four members; Mark Dreyfus, Josh Burns, Mike Freelander and Julian Leeser identified as Jewish. Labor members — Ed Husic and Anne Aly — became the first two Muslim federal ministers.

Membership

Senate 

40 of the 76 seats in the upper house were contested in the election in May 2022. The class of senators elected in 2022 are denoted with an asterisk (*).

Australian Capital Territory
  Katy Gallagher (ALP)*
  David Pocock (IND)*

New South Wales
  Tim Ayres (ALP)
  Andrew Bragg (LP)
  Ross Cadell (NAT)*
  Perin Davey (NAT)
  Mehreen Faruqi (AG)
  Hollie Hughes (LP)
  Jenny McAllister (ALP)*
  Jim Molan (LP)*
  Deborah O'Neill (ALP)*
  Marise Payne (LP)*
  Tony Sheldon (ALP)
  David Shoebridge (AG)*

Northern Territory
  Malarndirri McCarthy (ALP)*
  Jacinta Nampijinpa Price (CLP)*

Queensland
  Penny Allman-Payne (AG)*
  Matt Canavan (LNP)*
  Anthony Chisholm (ALP)*
  Nita Green (ALP)
  Pauline Hanson (PHON)*
  Susan McDonald (LNP)
  James McGrath (LNP)*
  Gerard Rennick (LNP)
  Malcolm Roberts (PHON)
  Paul Scarr (LNP)
  Larissa Waters (AG)
  Murray Watt (ALP)*

South Australia
  Alex Antic (LP)
  Simon Birmingham (LP)*
  Don Farrell (ALP)*
  David Fawcett (LP)
  Karen Grogan (ALP)
  Sarah Hanson-Young (AG)
  Kerrynne Liddle (LP)*
  Andrew McLachlan (LP)*
  Barbara Pocock (AG)*
  Anne Ruston (LP)
  Marielle Smith (ALP)
  Penny Wong (ALP)*

Tasmania
  Wendy Askew (LP)*
  Catryna Bilyk (ALP)
  Carol Brown (ALP)
  Claire Chandler (LP)
  Richard Colbeck (LP)
  Jonathon Duniam (LP)*
  Jacqui Lambie (JLN)
  Nick McKim (AG)
  Helen Polley (ALP)*
  Tammy Tyrrell (JLN)*
  Anne Urquhart (ALP)*
  Peter Whish-Wilson (AG)*

Victoria
  Ralph Babet (UAP)*
  Raff Ciccone (ALP)
  Sarah Henderson (LP)*
  Jane Hume (LP)
  Bridget McKenzie (NAT)*
  James Paterson (LP)
  Janet Rice (AG)
  Jana Stewart (ALP)*
  Lidia Thorpe (IND)*
  David Van (LP)
  Jess Walsh (ALP)
  Linda White (ALP)*

Western Australia
  Slade Brockman (LP)
  Michaelia Cash (LP)*
  Dorinda Cox (AG)*
  Patrick Dodson (ALP)
  Sue Lines (ALP)*
  Matt O'Sullivan (LP)
  Fatima Payman (ALP)*
  Louise Pratt (ALP)
  Linda Reynolds (LP)
  Dean Smith (LP)*
  Jordon Steele-John (AG)
  Glenn Sterle (ALP)*

House of Representatives

All 151 seats in the lower house were contested in the election in May 2022.

Australian Capital Territory
  Andrew Leigh (ALP—Fenner)
  Alicia Payne (ALP—Canberra)
  David Smith (ALP—Bean)

New South Wales
  Anthony Albanese (ALP—Grayndler)
  Alison Byrnes (ALP—Cunningham)
  Chris Bowen (ALP—McMahon)
  Tony Burke (ALP—Watson)
  Linda Burney (ALP—Barton)
  Andrew Charlton (ALP—Parramatta)
  Jason Clare (ALP—Blaxland)
  Sharon Claydon (ALP—Newcastle)
  David Coleman (LP—Banks)
  Pat Conaghan (NAT—Cowper)
  Pat Conroy (ALP—Shortland)
  Mark Coulton (NAT—Parkes)
  Justine Elliot (ALP—Richmond)
  Paul Fletcher (LP—Bradfield)
  Mike Freelander (ALP—Macarthur)
  Andrew Gee (IND—Calare)
  David Gillespie (NAT—Lyne)
  Alex Hawke (LP—Mitchell)
  Dai Le (IND—Fowler)
  Kevin Hogan (NAT—Page)
  Ed Husic (ALP—Chifley)
  Stephen Jones (ALP—Whitlam)
  Barnaby Joyce (NAT—New England)
  Jenny Ware (LP—Hughes)
  Jerome Laxale (ALP—Bennelong)
  Julian Leeser (LP—Berowra)
  Sussan Ley (LP—Farrer)
  Kristy McBain (ALP—Eden-Monaro)
  Emma McBride (ALP—Dobell)
  Michael McCormack (NAT—Riverina)
  Melissa McIntosh (LP—Lindsay)
  Scott Morrison (LP—Cook)
  Fiona Phillips (ALP—Gilmore)
  Tanya Plibersek (ALP—Sydney)
  Gordon Reid (ALP—Robertson)
  Daniel Repacholi (ALP—Hunter)
  Michelle Rowland (ALP—Greenway)
  Sophie Scamps (IND—Mackellar)
  Sally Sitou (ALP—Reid)
  Allegra Spender (IND—Wentworth)
  Anne Stanley (ALP—Werriwa)
  Zali Steggall (IND—Warringah)
  Meryl Swanson (ALP—Paterson)
  Angus Taylor (LP—Hume)
  Susan Templeman (ALP—Macquarie)
  Matt Thistlethwaite (ALP—Kingsford Smith)
  Kylea Tink (IND—North Sydney)

Northern Territory
  Luke Gosling (ALP—Solomon)
  Marion Scrymgour (ALP—Lingiari)

Queensland
  Karen Andrews (LNP—McPherson)
  Stephen Bates (AG—Brisbane)
  Angie Bell (LNP—Moncrieff)
  Colin Boyce (LNP—Flynn)
  Scott Buchholz (LNP—Wright)
  Jim Chalmers (ALP—Rankin)
  Max Chandler-Mather (AG—Griffith)
  Milton Dick (ALP—Oxley)
  Peter Dutton (LNP—Dickson)
  Warren Entsch (LNP—Leichhardt)
  Garth Hamilton (LNP—Groom)
  Luke Howarth (LNP—Petrie)
  Bob Katter (KAP—Kennedy)
  Michelle Landry (LNP—Capricornia)
  David Littleproud (LNP—Maranoa)
  Shayne Neumann (ALP—Blair)
  Llew O'Brien (LNP—Wide Bay)
  Ted O'Brien (LNP—Fairfax)
  Graham Perrett (ALP—Moreton)
  Henry Pike (LNP—Bowman)
  Keith Pitt (LNP—Hinkler)
  Stuart Robert (LNP—Fadden)
  Phillip Thompson (LNP—Herbert)
  Bert van Manen (LNP—Forde)
  Ross Vasta (LNP—Bonner)
  Andrew Wallace (LNP—Fisher)
  Elizabeth Watson-Brown (AG—Ryan)
  Anika Wells (ALP—Lilley)
  Andrew Willcox (LNP—Dawson)
  Terry Young (LNP—Longman)

South Australia
  Matt Burnell (ALP—Spence)
  Mark Butler (ALP—Hindmarsh)
  Steve Georganas (ALP—Adelaide)
  Louise Miller-Frost (ALP—Boothby)
  Tony Pasin (LP—Barker)
  Rowan Ramsey (LP—Grey)
  Amanda Rishworth (ALP—Kingston)
  Rebekha Sharkie (CA—Mayo)
  James Stevens (LP—Sturt)
  Tony Zappia (ALP—Makin)

Tasmania
  Bridget Archer (LP—Bass)
  Julie Collins (ALP—Franklin)
  Brian Mitchell (ALP—Lyons)
  Gavin Pearce (LP—Braddon)
  Andrew Wilkie (IND—Clark)

Victoria
  Michelle Ananda-Rajah (ALP—Higgins)
  Adam Bandt (AG—Melbourne)
  Sam Birrell (NAT—Nicholls)
  Russell Broadbent (LP—Monash)
  Josh Burns (ALP—Macnamara)
  Darren Chester (NAT—Gippsland)
  Lisa Chesters (ALP—Bendigo)
  Libby Coker (ALP—Corangamite)
  Zoe Daniel (IND—Goldstein)
  Mark Dreyfus (ALP—Isaacs)
  Cassandra Fernando (ALP—Holt)
  Carina Garland (ALP—Chisholm)
  Andrew Giles (ALP—Scullin)
  Helen Haines (IND—Indi)
  Julian Hill (ALP—Bruce)
  Ged Kearney (ALP—Cooper)
  Peter Khalil (ALP—Wills)
  Catherine King (ALP—Ballarat)
  Richard Marles (ALP—Corio)
  Zoe McKenzie (LP—Flinders)
  Rob Mitchell (ALP—McEwen)
  Daniel Mulino (ALP—Fraser)
  Peta Murphy (ALP—Dunkley)
  Brendan O'Connor (ALP—Gorton)
  Clare O'Neil (ALP—Hotham)
  Sam Rae (ALP—Hawke)
  Joanne Ryan (ALP—Lalor)
  Monique Ryan (IND—Kooyong)
  Bill Shorten (ALP—Maribyrnong)
  Michael Sukkar (LP—Deakin)
  Dan Tehan (LP—Wannon)
  Kate Thwaites (ALP—Jagajaga)
  Alan Tudge (LP—Aston)
  Maria Vamvakinou (ALP—Calwell)
  Aaron Violi (LP—Casey)
  Tim Watts (ALP—Gellibrand)
  Anne Webster (NAT—Mallee)
  Keith Wolahan (LP—Menzies)
  Jason Wood (LP—La Trobe)

Western Australia
  Anne Aly (ALP—Cowan)
  Kate Chaney (IND—Curtin)
  Ian Goodenough (LP—Moore)
  Patrick Gorman (ALP—Perth)
  Andrew Hastie (LP—Canning)
  Matt Keogh (ALP—Burt)
  Madeleine King (ALP—Brand)
  Tania Lawrence (ALP—Hasluck)
  Sam Lim (ALP—Tangney)
  Nola Marino (LP—Forrest)
  Zaneta Mascarenhas (ALP—Swan)
  Melissa Price (LP—Durack)
  Tracey Roberts (ALP—Pearce)
  Josh Wilson (ALP—Fremantle)
  Rick Wilson (LP—O'Connor)

Changes in membership

Senate 
This table lists senators who have resigned, died, been elected or appointed, or otherwise changed their party affiliation during the 47th Parliament.

House of Representatives 
This table lists members of the House who have resigned, died, been elected or appointed, or otherwise changed their party affiliation during the 47th Parliament.

See also
 46th Parliament of Australia
 Albanese Government
 2020s in Australian political history
 Members of the Australian House of Representatives, 2022–2025
 Members of the Australian Senate, 2022–2025

Notes

References

Parliament of Australia